Richard Henry Rupert Bertie, 14th Earl of Lindsey and 9th Earl of Abingdon (born 28 June 1931) is an English peer.

He was a member of the House of Lords from 1963 to 1999, where he belonged to the Conservative group.

Early life
Lindsey is the son of Maj. Hon. Arthur Michael Cosmo Bertie (1886–1957) and, his first wife, Aline Rose (née Arbuthnot-Leslie) Ramsay. Before his parents' marriage, his mother was married to Hon. Charles Fox Maule Ramsay (the fourth son of John Ramsay, 13th Earl of Dalhousie), who died in 1926. After his mother's death, his father married Lilian Isabel (née Cary-Elwes) Crackanthorpe, a daughter of Charles Edward Cary-Elwes, in May 1949.

His father was the second son of Montagu Bertie, 7th Earl of Abingdon from his grandfather's second marriage to Gwendoline Mary Dormer, a daughter of the Lt.-Gen. James Charlemagne Dormer, an officer of the British Army. His father had inherited the earldom in 1938 from his fifth cousin thrice removed, Montague Bertie, 12th Earl of Lindsey. His maternal grandparents were George Arbuthnot-Leslie and Mary Rose Leslie, 12th of Warthill, the Chieftain of Clan Leslie. His uncle was William Douglas Arbuthnot-Leslie, 13th of Warthill (direct ancestor of actress Rose Leslie). Through his ancestor Emily Gage he is a descendant from the Schuyler and Van Cortlandt families of British North America.

He was educated at Ampleforth College.

Career
Bertie did his national service with the Royal Norfolk Regiment, becoming a second lieutenant on 6 February 1952 with seniority from 3 February 1951. On 25 July 1952, he was given the acting rank of lieutenant, and the promotion was made substantive on 28 June 1954 with seniority from the date of his acting rank. Bertie was transferred to the Regular Army Reserve from the Army Emergency Reserve on 24 September 1957.

Between 1958 and 1996, he was a Lloyd's broker. In 1963, he succeeded his half-cousin as Earl of Lindsey and Abingdon and hereditary High Steward of Abingdon and joined the House of Lords.

Personal life
In 1957, Bertie married Norah Elizabeth Farquhar-Oliver, the second daughter of Mark Farquhar-Oliver (second son of Sir Henry Farquhar, 4th Baronet) and Norah Frances Sapphire Farquhar (the eldest daughter and co-heiress of Maj. Francis Douglas Farquhar and Lady Evelyn Hely-Hutchinson, herself the eldest daughter of John Hely-Hutchinson, 5th Earl of Donoughmore). Together, they were the parents of two sons and a daughter:

 Henry Mark Willoughby Bertie, Lord Norreys (b. 1958), who married Lucinda Sol Morsoom, a cousin of Toby Young, both descendants of Admiral Sir Robert Moorsom, in 1989.
 Lady Annabel Frances Rose Bertie (b. 1969)
 Hon. Alexander Michael Richard Willoughby Bertie (b. 1970), who married Catherine Davina Cameron, a daughter of Gordon Cameron, in 1998.

He lives at Gilmilnscroft House, near Mauchline, a seat of his wife's family, the Farquhars.

Descendants
Through his eldest son and heir apparent, he is the grandfather of two, Hon. Willoughby Henry Constantine St Maur (b. 1996) and the Hon. James Frederick Christopher Ninian (b. 1997).

Through his youngest son, he is a grandfather of two, Fergus Bertie (b. 2000) and Emily Bertie (b. 2004).

References

1931 births
Living people
English people of Dutch descent
People educated at Ampleforth College
Royal Norfolk Regiment officers
Richard
14
9
Schuyler family
Van Cortlandt family
Lindsey